The men's long jump event at the 2015 Summer Universiade was held on 11 and 12 July at the Gwangju Universiade Main Stadium.

Medalists

Results

Qualification
Qualification: 7.85 m (Q) or at least 12 best (q) qualified for the final.

Final

References

Long
2015